DV Aquarii is a binary star system in the zodiac constellation of Aquarius. It has a peak apparent visual magnitude of 5.89, which is bright enough to be visible to the naked eye.

This is a detached eclipsing binary system of the Beta Lyrae type. The orbital period for the system is 1.5755 days and the eccentricity is unknown and probably non-zero; the orbital inclination is estimated to be . During the primary eclipse the magnitude drops to 6.25. It descends to 6.10 with the secondary eclipse (with 6.10 being brighter than 6.25). The pair have been identified as candidate Herbig Ae/Be stars, and catalogued as A-type shell stars.

A magnitude 10.8 star with the designation HD 358087 is a common proper motion companion. If it is gravitationally bound to the main system, the orbital period is estimated to be around 611,855 years

References

A-type main-sequence stars
Beta Lyrae variables
Herbig Ae/Be stars
Shell stars
Spectroscopic binaries
Aquarius (constellation)
Durchmusterung objects
199603
103545
8024
Aquarii, DV